This is a list of Superfund sites in Idaho, United States of America, as designated by the United States Environmental Protection Agency under the Comprehensive Environmental Response, Compensation, and Liability Act (CERCLA).  CERCLA, passed by Congress in 1980, authorized EPA to create a list of polluted locations requiring a long-term response to clean up hazardous-material contamination.  These locations are designated as Superfund sites, and are placed on EPA's National Priorities List (NPL). 

The NPL guides the EPA in "determining which sites warrant further investigation" for environmental remediation. The industrial sites were areas of mining, heavy metal processing and manufacturing, during a period when processes were inefficient and wastes were dumped, contaminating water and land, with polluting materials also released into the air. In many cases the companies responsible for contamination are no longer in business, and the federal government has had to contribute to clean-up to protect citizens' health.

As of April 2010, there were six Superfund sites in Idaho on the National Priorities List. Three more sites have been proposed as qualifying for entry on the list, and three have been cleaned up and removed from the list.

Superfund sites

In addition, a proposal to add the Triumph Mine Tailings Site to the NPL was made in 1993 but withdrawn in 2003 as the EPA felt that all major sources of risk had been mitigated.

See also

List of Superfund sites in the United States
List of environmental issues
List of waste types
TOXMAP

References

External links
EPA list of proposed Superfund sites in Idaho
EPA list of current Superfund sites in Idaho
EPA list of Superfund site construction completions in Idaho
EPA list of partially deleted Superfund sites in Idaho
EPA list of deleted Superfund sites in Idaho

Superfund
Idaho